Xam Neua (ຊຳເໜືອ , sometimes transcribed as Sam Neua or Samneua, literally 'northern swamp'), is the capital of Houaphanh Province, Laos, in northeast Laos.

Demographics
Residents are mostly Lao, Vietnamese, and Hmong, with some Tai Dam, Tai Daeng, and Tai Lu. The predominant language is Lao with minorities of Vietnamese and Hmong. French is spoken by a minority of people as a legacy of the French colonial era. It is taught in schools and used in public works and government.

Daily life

Xam Neua is in a valley in Houaphanh Province. At 05:45 and 17:45 each day there are public addresses from loudspeakers atop a tower on the school playground, expounding on communist life and philosophy. These addresses are usually accompanied by Lao music.

It is said that there is a communist re-education camp in Xam Neua and that it was the Pathet Lao capital during the Laotian Civil War Battle of Lima Site 85 (LS-85), 11 March 1968. It is near the Pathet Lao refuges in the Viengxay caves, which the Lao government hopes to promote as a tourism destination similar to the Củ Chi tunnels near Ho Chi Minh City in Vietnam and the Killing Fields Memorial near Phnom Penh in Cambodia. It is near Nam Et-Phou Louey National Protected Area (pronounced "naam et poo loo-ee").

References

External links

Populated places in Houaphanh Province